= Connecthings =

Software company

Connecthings is a software company with dual headquarters in Paris, France, and New York City, New York. Its main product is a location-based marketing solution (in SaaS) for mobile applications based on geofencing and machine learning and aiming at fostering better app experiences for mobile users.

The company also operates in the Smart City space, providing cities with the infrastructure required to distribute real-time information about transport and local news.

== History ==
Connecthings was founded in France in 2007 by Laetitia Gazel Anthoine and now operates in countries such as France, Spain, Italy, Brazil and the United States.

In September 2015, Connecthings raised $10.6 million as part of their Series-B funding round from French investment firms Siparex, Calao Finance and Xerys Funds.

== Awards ==
Over the years Connecthings solutions have won multiple awards such as

- Le Monde newspaper "Smart Cities Award" for the Mobility category in 2018
